AKM Fazlul Haque may refer to:
 AKM Fazlul Haque (Bangladesh Nationalist Party politician) (fl. 1991), former member of Parliament for Mymensingh-4
 AKM Fazlul Haque (Jatiya Party politician) (fl. 1988–1990), former member of Parliament for Naogaon-1
 AKM Fazlul Haque Milon (fl. 2001–2006), Bangladeshi politician
 A. K. M. Fazlul Haque (born 1949), Bangladeshi politician
 A. K. M. Fazlul Haque (surgeon) (born 1958), Bangladeshi surgeon

See also 
 Fazlul Haq or Fazlul Haque, a male Muslim given name
 Sheikh Fazlul Haque Mani (1939–1975), Bangladeshi politician